EA-1356 is an organophosphate nerve agent of the G-series. It is highly resistant to enzymatic degradation in the body.  The nerve agent was tested at Edgewood Arsenal in Maryland (the "EA" in "Ea-1356") among many other chemicals tested on humans. A novel enzyme was patented by the US Army in 2018 to break down EA-1356. It is a schedule 1 substance by the Chemical Weapons Convention standards. It is under the category of munitions of ML7.b.1.a.

References

G-series nerve agents
Acetylcholinesterase inhibitors
Methylphosphonofluoridates